Bawl may refer to:

Bawl, Irish band from the 1990s, predecessor of Pony Club
Bawls, energy drink
Crying (synonym)